Sonam Gyatso may refer to:

The 3rd Dalai Lama
Sonam Gyatso (mountaineer), oldest person to summit Everest when he summitted in 1965
Sonam Gyatso Lepcha, Indian politician from Sikkim